Joseph Goldstein (born May 20, 1944) is one of the first American vipassana teachers, co-founder of the Insight Meditation Society (IMS) with Jack Kornfield and Sharon Salzberg, a contemporary author of numerous popular books on Buddhism (see publications below), a resident guiding teacher at IMS, and a leader of retreats worldwide on insight (vipassana) and lovingkindness (metta) meditation.

While the majority of Goldstein's publications introduce Westerners to primarily Theravada concepts, practices and values, his 2002 work, One Dharma, explored the creation of an integrated framework for the Theravada, Tibetan and Zen traditions.

Chronology
May 20, 1944: Born; grew up in the Catskill Mountains of New York
1965: Graduated from Columbia University as a philosophy major
1965: Entered the Peace Corps in Thailand, where he first became interested in Buddhism. After the Peace Corps, he spent most of the next seven years in India studying and practicing Buddhist meditation
1974: He began teaching at Chogyam Trungpa's Naropa Institute in Boulder, Colorado.  He has been leading vipassana and metta retreats worldwide since 1974.
1975: Co-founded the IMS in Barre, Massachusetts with Jack Kornfield and Sharon Salzberg.
1991: Helped establish the Barre Center for Buddhist Studies.
1998: Co-founded the IMS Forest Refuge for long-term personal retreats.

Meditation practice
Goldstein had original experiences of realisation concerning the word 'unborn' and an experience of zero and of no self. He makes a 3-month meditation retreat most years. He says the peace and happiness we experience has to do with the quality of our minds, not our possessions. His book Mindfulness is based on the Satipatthana Sutta, a Buddhist text.

Teachers
Since 1967, Goldstein has practiced different forms of Buddhist meditation under well-known teachers from India, Burma and Tibet.  His teachers include: Anagarika Sri Munindra, Sri S.N. Goenka, Mrs. Nani Bala Barua (Dipa Ma), the Venerable Sayadaw U Pandita, Tulku Urgyen Rinpoche, and Nyoshul Khenpo Rinpoche.

Publications (partial list, in chronological order)
The Experience of Insight: A Simple and Direct Guide to Buddhist Meditation (1976)

Insight Meditation: A Step-By-Step Course on How to Meditate (2002), with Sharon Salzberg 
One Dharma: The Emerging Western Buddhism (2002)
A Heart Full of Peace (2007)

References

Further reading
Schwartz, Tony (1995). What Really Matters: Searching for Wisdom in America. NY: Bantam Books. .

External links

Goldstein's IMS biography
Downloadable talks at AudioDharma and Dharmaseed
Video interview with Joseph Goldstein 
Audio interview on the benefits of long term practice on Buddhist Geeks

1944 births
Living people
Jewish American writers
Buddhist writers
American Theravada Buddhists
Theravada Buddhist spiritual teachers
Mindfulness movement
Mindfulness (Buddhism)
Students of S. N. Goenka
Students of Dipa Ma
Students of U Pandita
Columbia College (New York) alumni
21st-century American Jews